Agrostis hooveri is a species of grass known by the common name Hoover's bent grass. It is endemic to California, where it is known only from western San Luis Obispo and Santa Barbara Counties.

Description
It grows in woodland and chaparral in hilly terrain. This is a perennial grass growing in tufts 30 to 80 centimeters tall. The inflorescence is an array of thin branches bearing tiny spikelets each a few millimeters long.

References

External links
Jepson Manual Treatment
USDA Plants Profile
Photo gallery

hooveri
Native grasses of California
Endemic flora of California